Little Rock Creek is a stream in Benton and Morrison counties, Minnesota, in the United States. It is a tributary of the Mississippi River.

Little Rock Creek was named for a rock outcropping near its mouth.

See also
List of rivers of Minnesota

References

Rivers of Benton County, Minnesota
Rivers of Morrison County, Minnesota
Rivers of Minnesota